Club Atlético Antoniano is a Spanish football team based in Lebrija, Province of Seville, in the autonomous community of Andalusia. Founded in 1964, it plays in Tercera División – Group 10, holding home games at Estadio Municipal de Lebrija, with a capacity of 3,500 seats.

History
Founded in 1964 as Juventud Antoniana, the club first reached Tercera División in the 1987–88 season, achieving an impressive fifth position. In that year, however, the club merged with UB Lebrijana to create CD Lebrija, in order to strengthen football in the city.

In 1994, as the merger was undone, Antoniano was refounded, and returned to the fourth division in 2001.

Season to season

Atlético Antoniano (1960)

1 season in Tercera División

Atlético Antoniano (1994)

10 seasons in Tercera División
1 season in Tercera División RFEF

Former players 
 Miguel Ángel Cordero
 Cala
 Toni

References

External links
Official website
Futbolme team profile 
LaPreferente team profile 

Football clubs in Andalusia
Association football clubs established in 1964
1964 establishments in Spain